Samira Hurem (born 14 November 1972) is a Bosnian retired professional footballer and current football manager. Since July 2010, she has been serving the position of head coach of Bosnian women's powerhouse SFK 2000. In the summer of 2011, she was named the new manager of the Bosnia and Herzegovina women's national football team.

Honours

Player
SFK 2000 
Bosnian Women's Premier League: 2002–03, 2003–04, 2004–05, 2005–06 
Bosnian Women's Cup: (2001–02 or 2002–03), 2003–04, 2005–06

Manager
SFK 2000 
Bosnian Women's Premier League: 2010–11, 2011–12, 2012–13, 2013–14, 2014–15, 2015–16, 2016–17, 2017–18, 2018–19, 2019–20, 2020–21, 2021–22
Bosnian Women's Cup: 2010–11, 2011–12, 2012–13, 2013–14, 2014–15, 2015–16, 2016–17, 2017–18, 2018–19, 2020–21, 2021–22

Individual
Bosnia and Herzegovina Manager of the Year: 2016

References

External links

1972 births
Living people
Footballers from Sarajevo
Bosniaks of Bosnia and Herzegovina
Bosnia and Herzegovina football managers
Female association football managers